Phaseolus trilobus can refer to:

Phaseolus trilobus Aiton, a synonym of Pueraria montana var. lobata (Willd.) Maesen & S.M.Almeida ex Sanjappa & Predeep
Phaseolus trilobus Michx., a synonym of Strophostyles helvola (L.) Elliott